The Glasgow Football League was formed in  in Scotland as one of several supplementary football leagues that were created in order to increase the number of fixtures for Scottish Football League clubs. In 1899 a number of clubs who played in the Edinburgh / East of Scotland Football League joined and the league was renamed the Inter City Football League.

In general, attendances were disappointing (for example only 3,000 watched Celtic v Rangers in May 1902 and only 2,500 were at Hampden Park for Queen's Park v Third Lanark in the League decider in 1905). Several Scottish Football League fixtures also doubled up as Glasgow League matches, including the 1904–05 title play-off on 6 May 1905 between Rangers and Celtic.

Membership

Celtic 1895–1899, 1904–1906
Clyde 1896–1899, 1905–1906
Partick Thistle 1898–1899, 1904–1906
Queen's Park 1895–1899, 1904–1906
Rangers 1895–1899, 1904–1906
Third Lanark 1895–1899, 1904–1906

Champions

1895–96 Rangers
1896–97 Queen's Park
1897–98 Rangers
1898–99 Celtic
1899–1904 - replaced by the Inter City Football League
1904–05 Third Lanark
1905–06 Third Lanark

See also
 Scottish Football (Defunct Leagues)

References

Defunct football leagues in Scotland
Football in Glasgow
1895 establishments in Scotland
Sports leagues established in 1895
Sports leagues disestablished in 1906
1906 disestablishments in Scotland

he:ליגות כדורגל מוספות#ליגת הכדורגל של גלאזגו